Barry Omar Wendell Skeete (born 18 January 1984) is a Barbadian footballer who plays as a defender for Paradise.

Career

In 2005, Skeete signed for Argentine fourth tier side Colegiales.

References

External links

 

Barbadian footballers
Expatriate footballers in Argentina
Barbadian expatriate footballers
Barbados international footballers
Living people
1984 births
Paradise FC (Barbados) players
Association football defenders
Sportivo Barracas players
Club Atlético Colegiales (Argentina) players